Michael John Kinnunen is a former professional baseball pitcher. He holds the major league record for most pitching appearances without a decision of any kind (win, loss or save) with 48.

Career
Kinnunen attended Washington State University, where he played college baseball for the Cougars from 1977 to 1979.

Kinnunen was selected by the Minnesota Twins in the 10th round of the 1979 Major League Baseball Draft, and was quickly promoted to the majors in 1980. Although he pitched reasonably well, he spent  in the minors before being traded to the St. Louis Cardinals. He finally made it back to the majors in  after bouncing around the minors for several years.

As of 2008, Kinnunen was living in Carolina, Puerto Rico, where he worked at Roberto Clemente Stadium.

References

External links

Baseball Gauge
Retrosheet
Mexican League
Venezuelan Professional Baseball League

1958 births
Living people
American expatriate baseball players in Mexico
Arkansas Travelers players
Baltimore Orioles players
Baseball players from Seattle
Columbus Clippers players
Denver Zephyrs players
Indianapolis Indians players
Jacksonville Suns players
Leones del Caracas players
American expatriate baseball players in Venezuela
Louisville Redbirds players
Major League Baseball pitchers
Memphis Chicks players
Mexican League baseball pitchers
Minnesota Twins players
Omaha Royals players
Orlando Twins players
Rochester Red Wings players
San Antonio Missions players
Tigres del México players
Toledo Mud Hens players
Tuneros de San Luis Potosí players
Washington State University alumni
Washington State Cougars baseball players
Wichita Aeros players
Alaska Goldpanners of Fairbanks players